Margot Ruth Aline Lister, Baroness Lister of Burtersett,  (born 3 May 1949), is currently Professor of Social Policy at Loughborough University. She has written or contributed to a number of books, pamphlets and articles on poverty, social security and women's citizenship.

Biography 
She was born to Dr Werner Bernard and Daphne (née Carter) Lister. She attended a private school and then the University of Essex, from which she graduated with a BA in sociology, and continued to an MA in multi-racial studies from the University of Sussex. She has also received honorary doctorates from the Caledonian University. After completing her MA, she worked for the Child Poverty Action Group.

She was appointed Commander of the Order of the British Empire (CBE) in the 1999 Birthday Honours and, in 2009, became a Fellow of the British Academy. She was appointed to the House of Lords as a life peer on 31 January 2011 as Baroness Lister of Burtersett, of Nottingham in the County of Nottinghamshire (Burtersett being the village her mother originated from). She sits as a member of the Labour Party.

Employment history

Child Poverty Action Group
 Legal Res. Officer, 1971–75
 Assistant Director, 1975–77
 Deputy Director 1977–79
 Director 1979–87

As a professor
 Professor of Applied Social Studies, University of Bradford, 1987–93
 Professor of Social Policy, Loughborough University, 1994 onwards
 Donald Dewar Visiting Professor of Social Justice, University of Glasgow, 2005–06

Miscellaneous
 Vice-Chair, NCVO, 1991–93
 Member: Opsahl Commission, 1992–93
 Commission for Social Justice, 1992–94
 Commission on Poverty, Participation and Power, 1999–2000
 Fabian Commission on Life Chances and Child Poverty, 2004–06
 National Equality Panel, 2008–10
 The Eleanor Rathbone Memorial Lecture, University of Leeds, 1989
 Founding Academician, Academy of Social Sciences, 1999

Publications

 Supplementary Benefit Rights, 1974
 Welfare Benefits, 1981
 The Exclusive Society, 1990
 Women's Economic Dependency and Social Security, 1992
 Citizenship: feminist perspectives, 1997, 2nd edition 2003
 Poverty, 2004
 Poverty, 2nd edition 2020 ISBN 978-0745645971
 Gendering Citizenship in Western Europe, 2007
 Co-editor of Why Money Matters, 2008
 Understanding Theories and Concepts in Social Policy, 2010

References

External links
 Debretts profile

Living people
1949 births
Alumni of the University of Sussex
Labour Party (UK) life peers
Life peeresses created by Elizabeth II
Academics of Loughborough University
Commanders of the Order of the British Empire
Fellows of the Academy of Social Sciences
Fellows of the British Academy
Alumni of the University of Essex
Academics of the University of Bradford
Academics of the University of Glasgow